Baciro Candé (born 18 March 1948 in Catió) is a Bissau-Guinean professional football player and manager.

Career
Candé played professional football in Portugal's Segunda Liga as a defender with Estrela da Amadora and Amora.

After he retired from playing, Candé became a football coach. He began managing in Guinea-Bissau with Desportivo de Farim,  U.D.I.B, Bula Futebol Clube, Estrela Negra de Bissau and Ajuda Sport Clube, and won the 1988–89 Taça Nacional da Guiné Bissau with Desportivo de Farim. Next, he spent several years managing Sporting Clube de Bissau, winning nine league titles with the club.

Since 2003 until 2010 he coached the Guinea-Bissau national football team. He returned as head coach of the national team in March 2016.

References

External links

Profile at Soccerpunter.com

1967 births
Living people
Guinea-Bissau international footballers
Association football defenders
Bissau-Guinean football managers
Guinea-Bissau national football team managers
2017 Africa Cup of Nations managers
People from Tombali Region
Bissau-Guinean footballers
C.F. Estrela da Amadora players
Amora F.C. players
2019 Africa Cup of Nations managers